Storyville Coffee (sometimes Storyville Coffee Company or simply Storyville) is a coffee company operating in the Seattle metropolitan area, in the U.S. state of Washington.

Description 
Storyville Coffee operates multiple coffee shops in the Seattle metropolitan area. The Seattle Times has described Storyville as a "roaster and mail-order coffee company". Bainbridge Island houses their Roasting Studio; the business also has shops in downtown Seattle with their flagship location being in the Corner Market building at Pike Place Market. In addition to coffee, the shops serve sandwiches and baked goods.

History 
Storyville was established on Bainbridge Island in 2006. The company announced plans to operate at Pike Place Market in 2013, occupying the space which previously housed Chez Shea. The business Storyville's third coffee shop opened in Queen Anne in 2014. The Queen Anne location has since closed as of 2022.

During 2013–2014, a writer for The Stranger asked readers not to support the company because of the author's claim of a connection to the Mars Hill Church.

Employees filed a petition to unionize in 2022.

Reception 
Cheyenne Buckingham selected Storyville for Washington in Eat This, Not Thats 2019 overview of the best coffee shops in each U.S. state.

Insider's Caroline Fox and Gabbi Shaw named Storyville Coffee the coziest coffee shop in Washington.

USA Today named Storyville Coffee as A top 10 Roaster in America.

References

External links 

 
 
 Storyville Coffee Company at Pike Place Market
 Storyville Coffee Company (Bainbridge Island) at Zomato

2006 establishments in Washington (state)
American companies established in 2006
Bainbridge Island, Washington
Central Waterfront, Seattle
Coffee companies of the United States
Coffee in Seattle
Coffeehouses and cafés in Washington (state)
Downtown Seattle
Pike Place Market
Queen Anne, Seattle